Martin John (born 1 August 1988) is a professional footballer who plays as a defender. He has played for Argentinos Juniors, Cardiff City, and Ontinyent.

Early life
Born in London, England, John has two brothers and one sister. At the age of 5 he moved to Italy where he lived for three years before moving to Canada. He grew up in Ottawa and attended Lisgar Collegiate Institute.

His mother is Swiss-Colombian and his father is Gambian.

Career

Youth and college
John played for the Maine Black Bears from the University of Maine in Orono, Maine, United States, after joining the team in 2005, before moving to the University at Buffalo, making 34 appearances for the university team Buffalo Bulls between 2007 and 2008.

Cardiff City
After spending time playing for the reserve side of Argentinos Juniors, he appeared in a pre-season match for Welling United during a 4–1 win over Arsenal Reserves on 24 July 2010. During the match, he was spotted by Cardiff City F.C. and was invited to join the club on trial in July 2010, eventually signing on a permanent basis. He made his debut on 11 August 2010 in a 4–1 win over Burton Albion in the first round of the Football League Cup.

On 9 September 2010, John joined Newport County on a three-month loan deal, making his debut in a 1–0 win over Rushden & Diamonds.

In August 2011 John went on trial for Maccabi Netanya from the Israeli Premier League. He played one game for the club in a Toto Cup fixture.

In 2012, John signed for Spanish Segunda B side Ontinyent CF.

John went on trial with Plymouth Argyle in July 2013.

References

External links

1988 births
Living people
Footballers from the London Borough of Camden
English footballers
Canadian soccer players
Maine Black Bears men's soccer players
Buffalo Bulls men's soccer players
Ottawa Fury (2005–2013) players
Argentinos Juniors footballers
Cardiff City F.C. players
Newport County A.F.C. players
USL League Two players
National League (English football) players
Association football defenders
Lisgar Collegiate Institute alumni
Canadian expatriate soccer players
Canadian expatriate sportspeople in Wales
English expatriate sportspeople in Canada
Expatriate soccer players in Canada
English expatriate footballers
Ontinyent CF players